Mohammad Tayyebi is an Iranian footballer who plays for Iranian club Sanat Naft Abadan as a centre back.

Club career

Esteghlal Khuzestan
Tayyebi joined Esteghlal Khuzestan in summer 2012. He was part of Esteghlal Khuzestan in their promotion to the Persian Gulf Pro League. He was one of few players that remained in Esteghlal Khuzestan squad after promotion, mostly utilized as right back and centre back.

Qatar 
On 20 July 2017, Tayyebi signed with Qatar SC.

Club career statistics

International career
He made his debut on 7 June 2016 against Kyrgyzstan in Azadi Stadium in Tehran in a Friendly.

Honours 
Esteghlal Khuzestan
Persian Gulf Pro League (1): 2015–16
Iranian Super Cup runner-up: 2016

References

External links
 Mohammad Tayyebi at PersianLeague.com
 Mohammad Tayyebi at IranLeague.ir

1986 births
Living people
Iranian footballers
Iranian expatriate footballers
Persian Gulf Pro League players
Azadegan League players
Esteghlal Khuzestan players
Pars Jonoubi Jam players
People from Behbahan
Association football defenders
Qatar SC players
Expatriate footballers in Qatar
Iranian expatriate sportspeople in Qatar
Qatar Stars League players
Sportspeople from Khuzestan province